Arif Şirin, commonly known as Ozan Arif (b. June 10, 1949 – d. February 13, 2019), was a Turkish folk music artist, composer, teacher, and bağlama virtuoso, foremost known for his ashik with lyrics propagating the Idealistic cause.

Life 
Şirin was born in his father's village Yükselen (Hapu) in Alucra district. By 1970, he had graduated from the Male Teacher's School in Ordu Province and worked as a primary school teacher in Samsun from 1970 to 1979. Following the 1980 Turkish coup d'état, he moved to Germany where he lived until his return to Turkey in 1991.
He and fellow folk singer İsmail Türüt had been on trial for a song allegedly praising the assassination of Hrant Dink. Şirin and Türüt were acquitted in December 2009.
Şirin died on February 13, 2019, of laryngeal cancer in Samsun Ondokuz in the Faculty of Medicine of the University of Mayıs.

References

External links
Ozan Arif website

1949 births
2019 deaths
Turkish composers
Turkish lyricists
Turkish folk musicians
Idealism (Turkey)
Bağlama players
Ondokuz Mayıs University alumni
Deaths from laryngeal cancer
Turkish male songwriters
Dutar players
Turkish Nationalist writers
Dombra players
20th-century Turkish male musicians
21st-century Turkish male musicians
Turkish folk poets
Burials in Turkey
Ashiks
People from Alucra
Deputies of Giresun
Death in Turkey
Pan-Turkists
Turanists
Nationalist musicians